Denbigh High School is a high school in Newport News, Virginia. It is a part of Newport News Public Schools.

Denbigh carries grades nine through twelve and has an enrollment of approximately 1,500 students. This school was rated "Fully Accredited" by the Virginia Department of Education for the 2005–2006 school year. Denbigh is the only host of the Aviation program in Newport News Public Schools.

Denbigh High School is represented by its mascot, the Patriot. Recently the known mascot picture of the Patriot was changed to a star with 'Patriots' across it. Rumors of possibly changing from the 'Patriots' and adopting a different mascot have been circulating, but nothing has been confirmed. Their colors are red, white, and blue. It also has the lowest-rated sports teams throughout the region. This school was opened in the fall of 1965 with grades 8-11, and the Junior class of that year became the first Senior class the following year. The class of 1970 was the first to go through all five years at Denbigh. For a time, Newport News had 5-year high schools, and Denbigh (the northernmost of the city's high schools) had 8-12th grades. The class of 1968 presented, as a memorial, a step from the first Denbigh school.

The Denbigh area of Newport News is named for the market town and community in Denbighshire, Wales.

Denbigh is also one of two sites in Newport News that hosts SAT testing and ACT testing.

Newport News Public Schools has a  Telecommunications Program, which allows students at Denbigh High Schools and other schools within the division to participate in live television production. These students can gain experience reporting, producing, recording, and editing for live productions such as local sporting events. Additionally, Denbigh's choral and band programs are award-winning in local, regional, state, and national competitions.

Demographics

Notable alumni
Antoine Bethea, NFL safety
Leslie "Les" Smith, former WAVY-TV and WTKR news anchor/reporter
Mike Tomlin, head coach of the Pittsburgh Steelers of the NFL (2007–present)
Tony Vinson, former NFL and NFL Europa running back
Joe Wooten, renowned keyboardist
Victor Wooten (Class of 1982), renowned bass guitarist
Robert Cray, renowned blues guitarist
DeWayne Craddock, 2019 Virginia Beach mass shooter who killed 12 people before killing himself 
Josiah Hughes, former Tiktok superstar and Bob Ross impersonator

References

External links
Denbigh High School Homepage
Denbigh High School Alumni Reunion website
Denbigh High School Band website

Educational institutions established in 1966
High schools in Newport News, Virginia
Public high schools in Virginia
1966 establishments in Virginia